Tesfaye Gebre Kidan Geletu (– 4 June 2004) was an Ethiopian general who was the acting president of Ethiopia for one week in late May 1991.

Biography

Military career
Prior to joining the Holetta Military Academy, Tesfaye took a one year teacher training course to become an elementary school teacher. After completing his training, he was assigned to Gamo Gofa province. Because of little pay and bad living conditions, he left his teaching job to join the Holetta Military Academy.

At the academy he met Mengistu Haile Mariam; according to Gebru Tareke, along with Legesse Asfaw and Gebreyes Wolde Hana Tesfaye was part of Mengistu's inner circle, his "pals Mengistu knew more intimately in less pressing times, men who played and drank with him and stood by him during the bloody factional days of the Derg." While a colonel, Tesfaye was a member of the Derg, the military committee which seized power from Emperor Haile Selassie, and which would later order the executions of his officials and allegedly the murder of the deposed Emperor himself. He had military successes in Somalia and Eritrea, notably as commander of the forces around Jijiga during the Ogaden War.

Elevated to the rank of Lt. General, Tesfaye Gebre Kidan went on to serve as the longtime Minister of Defence, then on 14 May 1988 was made military governor and general commander in Eritrea. He was recalled to Addis Ababa from Asmara to serve on the military tribunal, which tried the high-ranking officers who had tried to depose President Mengistu in 1989 following the decisive defeat at the Battle of Shire.

Vice President of Ethiopia
He was appointed as Vice President of Ethiopia in April 1991. He became acting president on 21 May 1991 when Mengistu fled as Ethiopian People's Revolutionary Democratic Front (EPRDF) forces closed in on the capital.

Tesfaye took over a regime in a state of utter collapse. He only ruled for a week before the EPRDF marched into Addis Ababa and seized power on 27 May 1991. "Government troops turned on one another," read one contemporary account. "Soldiers wantonly looted state property." Tesfaye realized almost as soon as he took power that he was in an untenable position. With the EPRDF closing in on Addis Ababa from all sides, Tesfaye informed the U.S. chargé d'affaires in Addis Ababa that he could no longer control the situation and had lost command of what was left of the army. After announcing a unilateral cease-fire he fled for the safety of the Italian Embassy. According to Paul B. Henze, Tesfaye had first sought sanctuary at the US embassy, but Ambassador Robert Houdek turned him away.

Asylum in the Italian Embassy
The General remained a virtual prisoner in the Embassy. He suffered a stroke while at the embassy, and as a result used a wheelchair to move around.

Death
Tesfaye's death was publicly confirmed on 4 June 2004.

It is rumored that he died after being hit over the head with a bottle during a physical brawl with Berhanu. CNN later reported that a source confirmed that Berhanu was not involved in the death.

In the book I noti ospiti, a waiter claimed that on June 2, 2004, Tesfaye was struck on the head with a bottle by his fellow refugee (and former Foreign Minister) Berhanu Bayeh, causing him to bleed. He was taken to Menelik II Hospital, where he was pronounced dead.

Notes 

 

 
 
 
 

1935 births
2004 deaths
Presidents of Ethiopia
Vice presidents of Ethiopia
Defence ministers of Ethiopia
Ethiopian military personnel
Workers' Party of Ethiopia politicians
Assassinated Ethiopian politicians
People murdered in Ethiopia
Government ministers of Ethiopia
Ethiopian communists
2004 crimes in Ethiopia
People of the Ethiopian Civil War
20th-century Ethiopian politicians